State Highway 28 (abbreviated SH-28) is a state highway in Oklahoma. It runs  in an irregular west-to-east pattern through Nowata, Rogers, Mayes and Delaware counties.

There is one letter-suffixed spur highway branching from SH-28, SH-28A.

Route description
SH-28 begins at US-169 just south of Delaware.

Crossing US-60, SH-28 runs six miles (10 km) due south to New Alluwe, then eight miles (13 km) south and east to Chelsea, where it intersects SH-66.

From Chelsea, it is six miles (10 km) straight south to the junction with SH-28A, where SH-28 turns due east, intersects with I-44 after four miles (6 km), and five miles (8 km) farther crosses US-69 at Adair.

Upon leaving Adair, SH-28 runs mainly east, eight miles (13 km) to Pensacola, then follows the arc of the Neosho River to the SH-82 junction outside of Langley. SH-28 crosses SH-82, then passes through Langley before crossing the Neosho River over Pensacola Dam into the town of Disney.

SH-28 then travels east to south  to its terminus at SH-20, five miles (8 km) west of Jay.

SH-28A

Junction list

References

External links
SH-28 at OKHighways

028
Transportation in Nowata County, Oklahoma
Transportation in Rogers County, Oklahoma
Transportation in Mayes County, Oklahoma
Transportation in Delaware County, Oklahoma